Merali is a surname. Notable people with the surname include:

Naushad Merali (1951–2021), Kenyan businessman
Pyarali Merali (born 1930), Ugandan architect
Shaheen Merali (born 1959), Tanzanian writer, curator, critic, and artist

See also
Morali